Meadmore is a surname. Notable people with the surname include:

Clement Meadmore (1929–2005), Australian-American sculptor 
Glen Meadmore, Canadian musician, actor and performance artist 
Marion Ironquill Meadmore (born 1936), Canadian lawyer and activist
Robert Meadmore, British singer and actor
Ron Meadmore (1933-2013), Canadian football player